Xeroplexa intersecta is a species of air-breathing land snail, a terrestrial pulmonate gastropod mollusk in the family Geomitridae.  

It was previously included within the genus Candidula.

This snail can be a pest species in agricultural settings.

Description
The  ×  shell has 5 convex whorls. The aperture is simple without a lip; the aperture margin is slightly reflected near the umbilicus. The umbilicus is open and variably wide. The periostracum is whitish or yellowish with brown bands or spots and finely striated. The animal is yellowish or bluish grey with dark brown pigments. The upper tentacles are long, and the lower tentacles are very short.

Distribution

This species is known to occur within its native range in a number of Central and Western European countries and islands including:
Great Britain
Ireland
France
Portugal
Belgium
Netherlands
Denmark
Spain
Germany

It also lives as an introduced species in:
Oregon, United States
Colombia
Chile
New Zealand
Australia

References

 Lowe, R. T. (1861). A list of shells observed or collected at Mogador and in its immediate environs, during a few days' visit to the place, in April 1859. i>Proceedings of the Zoological Society of London. 1860: 169-204
 Barker, G. M. (1999). Naturalised terrestrial Stylommatophora (Mollusca: Gastropoda). Fauna of New Zealand 38: 1-254.

External links
http://luisjavierchueca.com/research-3/candidula-s-l/
 Candidula intersecta at Animalbase taxonomy, short description, distribution, biology, status (threats), images
 Candidula intersecta  images at Encyclopedia of Life  
Fauna Europaea Search Distribution
 Pallary, P. (1922). Faune malacologique du Grand Atlas. Journal de Conchyliologie, 66 (2) [1921: 89-154, pl. 3-5; 66 (3) [1921]: 185-217. Paris.]
 Caziot, E. (1909). Description d'espèces nouvelles de mollusques terrestres et fluviatiles du département des Alpes-Maritimes. Bulletin de la Société zoologique de France. 34: 87-95, 99-104.

intersecta
Gastropods described in 1801